Viyyoor Shiva Temple is a Shiva temple located at Viyyoor, Thrissur, Kerala, India. It is situated on the northern bank of Puzhakkal river.

References

External links

Shiva temples in Kerala
Hindu temples in Thrissur district